The 2.2 and 2.5 are a family of inline-4 engines developed by Chrysler Corporation originally for the Chrysler K- and L-platforms cars and subsequently used in many other Chrysler vehicles. After its launch in 1981, it became the basis for all Chrysler-developed 4-cylinder engines until the Chrysler 1.8, 2.0 & 2.4 engine family was released in 1994. It was the first Chrysler engineered four cylinder engine since the Chrysler flathead four cylinder was discontinued in 1933.

2.2
The first version of this engine family was a normally aspirated  unit. Developed under the leadership of Chief Engineer – Engine Design and Development Willem Weertman and head of performance tuning Charles "Pete" Hagenbuch, who had worked on most of Chrysler's V-8 engines and the Chrysler Slant-6 engine, it was introduced in the 1981 Dodge Aries, Dodge Omni, Plymouth Horizon and Plymouth Reliant, and was produced until 2000. 

It is a siamesed engine: there are no coolant passages between cylinders. All 2.2 engines have cast iron blocks, use a timing belt, and are non-interference engines. The earliest version used a two-barrel carburetor, but fuel injection was introduced in 1984 on both turbocharged and normally aspirated models (it is used on all 2.5 liter engines). Fuel injection was standard on some higher end models such as the Chrysler E-Class, Laser, and New Yorker, and the Dodge 600 and Daytona. In 1985 fuel injection became optional on the lower end models (Dodge Omni/Plymouth Horizon, Dodge Aries/Plymouth Reliant), eventually replacing the carbureted variant across the board.

Four series of turbocharged 2.2 and 2.5 liter engines were produced, normally referred to as Turbo I, Turbo II, Turbo III, and Turbo IV.  The primary difference between these engines was the use of an intercooler (in all except Turbo I). The Turbo III, ironically developed after the Turbo IV, pioneered returnless fuel injection, and was coupled to high-performance, four-valve-per-cylinder heads, bringing  from the 2.2 liter engine. The Turbo IV pioneered the use of variable nozzle technology to minimize lag.

The 2.2 was made at Chrysler's Trenton Engine plant in Trenton, Michigan. In 1995 Chrysler sold much of the machining equipment as well as the license to the design, to First Auto Works of China, after negotiations which had begun in the mid-eighties. The Trenton plant largely switched to the new Chrysler 3.3 engine production, while FAW continues to build the 2.2, which they used in their version of the Audi 100. In 1982, Chrysler also signed an agreement with Perkins Engines to build a dieselized version of the 2.2 (and of the 3.7-liter inline-six) in Windsor, Ontario. Design work on the six had started in 1975, with the 2.2 added to the program in 1980, but due to labor unrest in Canadian automobile manufacture and the collapse of the diesel market in North America, Lee Iacocca suddenly and unilaterally cancelled these plans in 1983.

 1983–1984 Chrysler E-Class
 1983–1986 Chrysler Executive
 1984–1986 Chrysler Laser
 1982–1990 Chrysler LeBaron (fuel-injected after 1985)
 1985–1988 Chrysler LeBaron GTS
 1981–1982 Dodge 024
 1982–1983 Dodge 400
 1983–1988 Dodge 600 (fuel-injected after 1984)
 1981–1989 Dodge Aries (fuel-injected after 1985)
 1984–1987 Dodge Caravan
 1983–1987 Dodge Charger
 1987–1988 Dodge Dakota
 1984–1990 Dodge Daytona
 1981–1990 Dodge Omni (fuel-injected after 1987)
 1985–1989 Dodge Lancer
 1982–1984 Dodge Rampage
 1987–1994 Dodge Shadow
 Hongqi CA 1021U3, CA5020XJB police car, CA7202, CA7220A9E, CA7220A9E parade car, CA7220A9EL1/L2 cabrio-coach/L2 parade car, CA7220A9EL2A2 parade car, CA7220EL1, CA7226L
 1985–1988 Plymouth Caravelle
 1981–1990 Plymouth Horizon (fuel-injected after 1987)
 1981–1989 Plymouth Reliant (fuel-injected after 1985)
 1983 Plymouth Scamp (Dodge Rampage twin)
 1987–1994 Plymouth Sundance
 1981–1982 Plymouth TC3
 1983–1987 Plymouth Turismo
 1984–1987 Plymouth Voyager

High Output
The 1983 and 1984 Dodge Shelby Charger was more of a handling package, but the regular 2.2 L engine was modified somewhat. These modifications allowed the Shelby Charger to hit  in 5.5 seconds and cover the quarter mile (402 m) in under 16 seconds. The 1985 Dodge Charger Shelby used the 2.2 Turbo I engine instead, so this high output 2.2 was made an option on regular Dodge Chargers that year.

Applications of the High Output 2.2L included the 1983–1984 Dodge Shelby Charger, the 1985 Plymouth Turismo (L-body), the 1984-1985 Dodge Omni GLH and the 1985–1987 Dodge Charger. This High Output version of the 2.2L could be easily recognized by its chrome valve cover and tighter timing cover.

Turbo I

For 1985, a computer-controlled wastegate was substituted which, with the use of a knock sensor, allowed  of temporary overboost. A Mitsubishi TE04H turbo and new intake manifold were used for 1988.

 1984 Chrysler E-Class
 1984–1986 Chrysler Executive
 1984–1986 Chrysler Laser
 1984–1988 Chrysler LeBaron
 1985–1988 Chrysler LeBaron GTS
 1984–1987 Chrysler New Yorker
 1988 Chrysler New Yorker Turbo
 1984–1988 Dodge 600
 1985–1988 Dodge Lancer
 1984–1986 Dodge Omni GLH
 1985–1988 Plymouth Caravelle
 1985–1987 Dodge Charger Shelby
 1988 Shelby CSX-T
 1984–1986  Dodge Daytona Turbo
 1987 Dodge Daytona Shelby Z with Automatics

Turbo II

The Turbo II designation was applied to a turbocharged, intercooled version of the 2.2. This Turbo II designation was first used in the 1986 Shelby GLH-S and the 1987 Shelby Charger GLH-S. Shelby Automobiles modified a stock Turbo I engine by swapping several pre-production pieces from the Turbo II inline-four engine. These changes included an intercooler and other changes to produce 175 hp (130 kW) and a flat 175 ft·lbf (237 N·m) torque curve. Not included were any of the durability changes to the short block (forged crank, full floating pin, stouter connecting rods, etc.) of the 1987 Chrysler Turbo II engine that was produced by the factory the following year. Shelby installed the factory produced Turbo II in his Shelby Lancer and Shelby CSX. Chrysler's strengthened version of this engine, with a forged crankshaft and connecting rods, was used in the Shelby Z package of the 1987–1989 Dodge Daytona and other cars.

A similar, one-piece version of the special two-piece intake manifold  used on the Turbo II, minus the air charge temperature sensor, was added to the Turbo I for 1988. The next year, the new common block was introduced; it was used for all subsequent versions of the 2.2 and 2.5, including the 2.2 L Turbo II, which then continued unchanged through 1990.

 1986 Shelby GLH-S (Omni)
 1987 Shelby Charger Turbo
 1987 Shelby GLHS (Charger)
 1985–1993 Consulier GTP
 1987–1989 Dodge Daytona Shelby Z
 1987–1988 Shelby CSX
 1987 Shelby Lancer
 1988–1989 Dodge Lancer Shelby
 1988–1989 Chrysler LeBaron GTS hatchback
 1987–1989 Chrysler LeBaron coupe / convertible GTC
 1989 Dodge Daytona C/S

Turbo III
The Turbo III  used a Lotus-made DOHC 16-valve head. This engine was used in 1,399 Dodge Spirit R/T and several hundred Dodge and Chrysler Daytona IROC R/T models in the US, Canada, and Europe, plus models including the Chrysler Spirit R/T and Phantom R/T in Mexico.

Cars using the 2.2T3 engine include:
 1991–1992 Dodge Spirit R/T (North America)
 1991–1994 Chrysler Spirit R/T (Mexico)
 1992–1993 Dodge Daytona IROC R/T (North America, Europe)
 1992–1993 Chrysler Phantom R/T (Mexico)
 1991–1993 Consulier GTP (USA)

Turbo IV
The Turbo IV was a turbocharged SOHC intercooled version with variable nozzle turbo (VNT) technology. This system reduced turbo lag. Used in the 1989 Shelby CSX, then regular production 1990 Dodge Shadows, Daytonas, and Chrysler LeBarons. Production on this engine was limited to around 1250 units..

 1989 Shelby CSX (500 built-498 to the public)
 1990 Dodge Shadow ES (141 built)
 1990 Dodge Shadow Competition (27 built)
 1990 Dodge Daytona Shelby (536 built)
 1990 Dodge Daytona C/S Competition (21 built)
 1990 Chrysler LeBaron GTC (255 built, 123 coupes 132 convertibles)

TC
The Chrysler TC, developed with Maserati, used a special turbocharged 2.2 engine. This version was related to the Turbo II but used a special 16-valve head — not the same as that used in the Turbo III — pistons, connecting rods, intake manifold, crankshaft and other components. No parts are interchangeable with other versions of the engine.

The 2.2 TC engine was an international effort: The cylinder head was cast in England by Cosworth and finished in Italy by Maserati using a cam over bucket design. The pistons are forged and came from Mahle in Germany, and a Japanese turbocharger was sourced from IHI. The camshafts were designed by Florida-based Crane but were constructed by Maserati in Modena. The rods are forged Casar units and use a unique rod bearing size. The crankshaft is also forged and weighs 53 pounds. Only 501 Chrysler TCs were produced with the DOHC 16-valve head. This engine shares essentially only the front and rear main seals, oil pan seal, intermediate shaft and bearings, main bearings (only, rod bearings are unique), and distributor with any other Chrysler 2.2/2.5. This head was also used in IMSA racing, but not in turbocharged form.

2.5
 
The increased displacement came from a raised deck and longer  stroke, making the 2.5 engine even more undersquare and tuned for low-end torque rather than high-RPM power. This engine replaced the Mitsubishi 2.6 engine Chrysler had been using. In 1989 there was a redesign of the 2.5 to permit both it and the 2.2 to use a common cylinder block. The crankshaft, connecting rods and pistons are completely different in the common-block 2.5 compared to the previous 2.5. This engine competed with Ford Motor Company's HSC engine, which was increased from 2.3 L to 2.5 L for use in the 1986 to 1991 Taurus. The Chrysler 2.5 was retired in 1995.

 1986–1993 Chrysler LeBaron
 1986–1987 Chrysler New Yorker
 1986–1988 Dodge 600
 1986–1989 Dodge Aries
 1987½–1995 Dodge Caravan
 1989–1995 Dodge Dakota
 1986–1993 Dodge Daytona
 1988–1993 Dodge Dynasty
 1986–1989 Dodge Lancer
 1987–1994 Dodge Shadow
 1989–1995 Dodge Spirit
 1989–1995 Plymouth Acclaim
 1986–1988 Plymouth Caravelle
 1986–1989 Plymouth Reliant
 1987–1994 Plymouth Sundance
 1987½–1995 Plymouth Voyager

Turbo I
The 2.5 engine was offered in a Turbo I form starting in 1989.

 1989–1992 Chrysler LeBaron
 1989–1990 Dodge Caravan
 1989–1992 Dodge Daytona
 1989–1992 Dodge Shadow
 1989–1992 Dodge Spirit
 1989–1992 Plymouth Acclaim
 1989–1991 Plymouth Sundance
 1989–1990 Plymouth Voyager

Turbo II

Carbureted
 In the Mexican market, 1986 through 1990 vehicles used versions of the 2.2 and 2.5 engines operating on leaded gasoline, equipped with a carburetor, a tubular exhaust header, and electronic control of ignition timing. This induction and ignition system used technology and components very similar to those employed in Chrysler's US-market Lean Burn emission control systems of the late 1970s. This configuration was discontinued in favour of electronic fuel injection for the 1991 model year, when exhaust emission regulations took force in Mexico.

FFV
From 1993 to 1995, a  multipoint fuel injected non-turbo version of the 2.5 engine was installed in flexible-fuel Dodge Spirits and Plymouth Acclaims. This engine and its fuel supply and computerized management system were specially modified to run on fuel containing up to 85% Methanol. Most of the MPFI system was common with the Mexican-market 2.5 MPFI engine. Modifications included upgraded seal and gasket materials, chrome piston rings, stainless-steel fuel system components, sion fuel injectors internally plated with nickel, and fuel composition sensors.

MPFI
From 1991 to 1995 in the Mexican market, multipoint fuel injected, non-turbo version of the 2.2 and 2.5 were installed in many Chrysler Corporation vehicles. The MPFI system gave better driveability, performance and fuel economy, and cleaner emissions, but was nevertheless not used elsewhere than the Mexican domestic market and Chrysler de Mexico's export markets.

Engine computers
Various kinds of Engine Control Units were used with the 2.2 and 2.5 engines. From 1984–1987, the ECU was divided into the Logic Module (LM), which was inside the passenger cabin, and the Power Module located near the battery on the left front fender. The LM used a Motorola 6803U4 processor operating at 1 MHz, with 256 bytes of RAM and either two 8K EPROMs or one 16K EPROM. From 1988–1989, a SMEC (Single Module Engine Controller) was used. This was a complete redesign of the older system, using modern CAD for board design, and higher density SMD components. The processor was a 68HC11 operating at 2 MHz with 256 bytes of RAM and a 32K EPROM. Functionally, the SMEC was the combination of the earlier Logic and Power modules into one unit. Starting in 1990, a more advanced SBEC (Single Board Engine Controller) was used, which integrated the earlier two board computer into a single board.

See also
 List of Chrysler engines

References

Chrysler engines